The 1987-88 Four Hills Tournament took place at the four traditional venues of Oberstdorf, Garmisch-Partenkirchen, Innsbruck and Bischofshofen, located in Germany and Austria, between 30 December 1987 and 6 January 1988.

Results

Overall

References

External links 
 Official website 

Four Hills Tournament
1987 in ski jumping
1988 in ski jumping
1987 in German sport
1988 in German sport
1988 in Austrian sport